Colin John Tibbett (born 18 March 1951) is a former English cricketer. Tibbett was a right-handed batsman. He was born at Luton, Bedfordshire.

Tibbett made his debut for Bedfordshire against Shropshire in the 1971 Minor Counties Championship. He played minor counties cricket for Bedfordshire from 1971 to 1979, making eighteen appearances, the last of which came against Suffolk in the 1979 Minor Counties Championship. In 1979, he was selected to play for Minor Counties South in the Benson & Hedges Cup, making a single List A appearance against Worcestershire at London Road, High Wycombe. Worcestershire won the toss and elected to bat, making 197/9 in their 55 overs. Minor Counties South were then dismissed for just 94 in their innings, with Rudd making a single run before he was dismissed by Norman Gifford.

References

External links
Colin Tibbett at ESPNcricinfo
Colin Tibbett at CricketArchive

1951 births
Living people
Cricketers from Luton
English cricketers
Bedfordshire cricketers
Minor Counties cricketers